The 1997 European Ladies' Team Championship took place 9–13 July at Nordcenter Golf & Country Club in Åminnefors, Finland. It was the 20th women's golf amateur European Ladies' Team Championship.

Venue 
The hosting club was founded in 1988. Its first course, the Fream course, situated in Åminnefors, close to Pohja in the province of Southern Finland and part of the Uusimaa region, 70 kilometres west of Helsinki, Finland, was designed by architect Ronald Fream. The course meanders across a varied landscape from a lush seashore towards a forest plateau full of steep elevation changes and the old park area of a manor house.

A second 18-hole-course, the Benz course, located on a forest plateau, was designed by Bradford Benz and inaugurated in 1993.

The championship course was set up with par 72.

Format 
All participating teams played two qualification rounds of stroke-play with six players, counted the five best scores for each team.

The eight best teams formed flight A, in knock-out match-play over the next three days. The teams were seeded based on their positions after the stroke-play. The first placed team was drawn to play the quarter final against the eight placed team, the second against the seventh, the third against the sixth and the fourth against the fifth. In each match between two nation teams, two 18-hole foursome games and five 18-hole single games were played. Teams were allowed to switch players during the team matches, selecting other players in to the afternoon single games after the morning foursome games. Games all square after 18 holes were declared halved, if the team match was already decided.

The eight teams placed 9–16 in the qualification stroke-play formed flight B , to play similar knock-out match-play, with one foursome game and four single games, to decide their final positions.

Teams 
16 nation teams contested the event. Each team consisted of six players.

Players in the leading teams

Other participating teams

Winners 
Team Italy and team France tied the lead in the opening 36-hole qualifying competition, each with a score of 7 over par 727, three strokes ahead of team England. Italy earned first place on the tie breaking better total non-counting scores. 

Individual leader in the 36-hole stroke-play competition was Karine Icher, France, with a score of 7 under par 137, two strokes ahead of Janice Moodie, Scotland.

Team Sweden won the championship, beating Scotland 4–3 in the final and earned their third title. Team France earned third place, beating Wales 5–2 in the bronze match.

Results 
Qualification round

Team standings

* Note: In the event of a tie the order was determined by the better total non-counting scores.

Individual leaders

 Note: There was no official award for the lowest individual score.

Flight A

Bracket

Final games

Flight B

Bracket

Final standings

Sources:

See also 
 Espirito Santo Trophy – biennial world amateur team golf championship for women organized by the International Golf Federation.
 European Amateur Team Championship – European amateur team golf championship for men organised by the European Golf Association.

References

External links 
 European Golf Association: Results

European Ladies' Team Championship
Golf tournaments in Finland
European Ladies' Team Championship
European Ladies' Team Championship
European Ladies' Team Championship